Sándor Reisenbüchler (February 16, 1935, Budapest – April 1, 2004, Budapest) was a Hungarian animated film director and graphic artist.

He took a degree in directing of films from the Academy of Theatre and Film Arts in Budapest. He was working for PannóniaFilm in Budapest since 1965. Folk tales, fantastic and ecological themes had a particular appeal to him; he was a self-taught graphic artist with pop-art influences. A unique figure on the Hungarian Art Scene, he was given the highest national prize for his achievements: the Kossuth Award.

Films
1968 "Kidnapping of the Sun and the Moon"
1972 "The Year of 1812"
1975 "Moon Flight"
1978 "Panic"
1983 "A Peacemaking Expedition"
1987 Isten Veled, Kis Sziget! ("Farewell, Little Island")
1990 Allegro vivace
1992 "Green Warnings For Every Day"
1995 Ecotópia
1999 Boldog világvége ("Merry Apocalypse")
2002 "The Advent of Light"

Awards
1970 Mamaia - Golden Pelican
1973 Giffoni - Silver Cup
1974 New York - Special Prize of the Jury
1973 Cannes - Special Prize
1974 London - Among the best films of the years
1983 Rome - The best film
1984 Budapest - Jules Verne Prize
1988 Espinho - Category I. Prize
1988 Kecskemét - KAFF's Kecskemét City Award for Isten Veled, Kis Sziget! ("Farewell, Little Island")
1989 Lille - The best short film
1989 Annecy - Prize of the Journalists
1993 Kecskemét - KAFF's Kecskemét City Award for Allegro vivace
1996 Kecskemét - KAFF's Grand Prix for Ecotópia
1997 Cairo - Silver Cairo
1999 Kecskemét - KAFF's Best Soundtrack for Boldog világvége ("Merry Apocalyps")
2002 Kecskemét - KAFF's The Foundation of Animated Film Art's Life's Achievements Award

References

1935 births
2004 deaths
Film people from Budapest
Hungarian animated film directors